This is a list of seasons completed by the USC Trojans men's college basketball team.

Seasons

  Bobby Muth replaced Ernie Holbrook midseason after going 6–4, 0–1 in conference. Muth finished season as interim coach, going 2–8 and 1–4 in conference.
  Charlie Parker fired midseason after going 12–9, 3–6 in conference. Henry Bibby finished season as interim coach, going 1–8 and 1–8 in conference.
  Henry Bibby fired midseason after going 2–2. Jim Saia finished season as interim coach, going 10–15 and 5–13 in conference.
  USC vacated all 21 of its wins, one loss, and its NCAA Tournament appearance for 2007–08 after O. J. Mayo was ruled ineligible. Official record is 0–11 (0–7 Pac–10) with no postseason participation.
  Official record is 64–50 (27–33 Pac-10).
  Kevin O'Neill fired midseason after going 7–10, 2–2 in conference. Bob Cantu finished season as interim coach, going 7–8 and 7–7 in conference.
  Official record reflecting 21 vacated wins and 1 vacated loss from 2007–08 season.

References

USC Trojans
USC Trojans basketball seasons